Aroostook is an unincorporated community in Victoria County, New Brunswick, Canada. It held village status prior to 2023.

Geography
The community is located on the west bank of the Saint John River at the mouth of the Aroostook River. It is approximately 11 kilometres north of Perth-Andover.

History

Aroostook was founded in 1852 and became an important railway centre in 1878 with the completion of the New Brunswick Railway from Fredericton to Edmundston and the Aroostook River Railway from Aroostook to Caribou, Maine. Both railways were leased by the Canadian Pacific Railway (CPR) in 1890 and a large rail yard and locomotive roundhouse was constructed in the village to service CPR trains operating in northwestern New Brunswick and northern Maine.

The construction of taxpayer-funded highways during the 20th century saw railways decline in use following World War II. CPR abandoned service through Aroostook in March 1987 following the loss of 2 bridges to ice jams downstream from the village.

On 1 January 2023, Aroostook amalgamated with Perth-Andover and parts of two local service districts to form the new village of Southern Victoria. The community's name remains in official use.

Demographics 
Revised census figures based on the 2023 local governance reforms have not been released.

Notable people

See also
List of communities in New Brunswick

References

External links

Communities in Victoria County, New Brunswick
Former villages in New Brunswick